Sir Edmund Vivian Gabriel  (28 March 1875 – 13 February 1950) was a British civil servant, army officer, courtier and art collector.

Biography
Edmund Vivian Gabriel was born on 28 March 1875. Educated at Emmanuel College, University of Cambridge (B.A., 1896), he entered the Indian Civil Service in 1897 and the Indian Political Service in 1913. In his early years he served as attaché to the 1903 Coronation Durbar, Political Advisor to Chandra Shamsher Jang Bahadur Rana, Prime Minister of Nepal (1907), Resident of Western Rajputana States (1908), and Chief Secretary, North-West Frontier Province (1910).

During the First World War he was first assigned to the Imperial General Staff, War Office, in London, where he was closely associated with Lord Kitchener, then Secretary of State for War. He subsequently joined the British Military Mission with the Italian Royal Army, as the head of the intelligence section, and later served as liaison officer to the naval forces in the Aegean Sea (British Aegean Squadron). 

In 1917, he was deployed to Cairo and assigned to the Egyptian Expeditionary Force. On 11 December 1917, he entered Jerusalem with General Edmund Allenby and was appointed financial advisor and assistant administrator of Palestine (then known as Occupied Enemy Territory Administration South).  

After the war he moved to Britain and maintained his services with the Territorial Army, reaching the rank of colonel. His London residence was 40, Wilton Crescent. On 11 December 1924 he married Mabel McAfee, an American citizen, in a celebration held at Saint Thomas Church in New York City. 

In 1925, he was appointed to King George V's household as a Gentleman Usher in Ordinary, a title he maintained until his death. In the 1937 Coronation Honours he was knighted by King George VI. During the Second World War he was a member of the British Air Commission to the United States of America.

Edmund Vivian Gabriel descended from the Gabrielli, a noble Italian family from Gubbio, a branch of which had settled in England in the 17th century. He maintained there a residence at 10, via Ducale, was honorary curator of the local Palazzo Ducale, and supported the restoration of local artifacts and buildings. In the 1920s he decided to bequeath the collection of art he had gathered during his stay in Asia to the municipality of Gubbio: the Vivian Gabriel Oriental Collection of Tibetan, Nepalese, Chinese and Indian Art is today exposed in the Palazzo dei Consoli in the Umbrian hilltown. 

For this and his services during the war he was appointed by King Victor Emmanuel III Officer, Order of the Crown of Italy, and Officer, Order of Saints Maurice and Lazarus. He also was a Knight of Justice of the Venerable Order of Saint John of Jerusalem. He was also awarded the Order of Saint Agatha by the Republic of San Marino.

In 1926, Sir Vivian acquired the site of the Inn of the Tongue of England in the Old Town of Rhodes in the Dodecanese. It was in turn given by his heirs to the ‘People of Greece’ in 1972.

Death

He died in Antigua, Leeward Islands, British West Indies on 13 February 1950, at the residency of the Governor, the 2nd Earl Baldwin.

His portrait by John Newman Holroyd is exposed at the Museum of the Order of St John in London.
He received the King George VI Version of the Royal Household Long and Faithful Service Medal in 1945 for 20 years of service to the British Royal Family as Gentleman Usher in Ordinary.

Bibliography
 Vivian Gabriel. The troubles of the Holy Land, London, 1922

References

 C. Hayavadana Rao. The Indian Biographical Dictionary. Pillar & Co., Madras, 1915
 The London Gazette, 1 January 1929
 John Debrett. Debrett's Baronetage, Knightage, and Companionage. Dean & Son, London, 1931
 Supplement to the London Gazette, 11 May 1937
 The Guardian. The Mandate years: colonialism and the creation of Israel. theguardian.com, 31 May 2001
 Paul John Rich. Creating the Arabian Gulf. The British Raj and the Invasion of the Gulf. Lexington Books, 2009

External links
 Portrait by John Newman Holroyd

1875 births
1950 deaths
Alumni of Emmanuel College, Cambridge
British Army personnel of World War I
Knights of Justice of the Order of St John
Knights Bachelor
Gentlemen Ushers
Companions of the Order of the Star of India
Companions of the Order of St Michael and St George
Commanders of the Royal Victorian Order
Commanders of the Order of the British Empire
Fellows of the Society of Antiquaries of London
Officers of the Order of Saints Maurice and Lazarus
Administrators of Palestine
Chief secretaries (British Empire)
Indian Political Service officers